Astralium stellare, common name the blue-mouthed turban, is a species of sea snail, a marine gastropod mollusk in the family Turbinidae, the turban snails.

Description
The size of the shell varies between 25 mm and 50 mm. The solid, imperforate shell has a conoid shape. It is more or less elevated. The 5-6 whorls are obliquely radiately costate, imbricately spinose at the periphery. The body whorl is carinated, carina with about ten long vaulted spines. The base of the shell contains about ten concentric squamose lirae. The white columella is oblique and is generally rosy margined, rarely bluish. The aperture is angulated.

The white or green operculum is granulose outside. The animal has no lateral filaments.

Distribution
This marine species occurs in the tropical Indo- West Pacific and off Australia (Northern Territory, Queensland, Western Australia)

References

 Gmelin J.F. 1791. Caroli a Linné. Systema Naturae per regna tria naturae, secundum classes, ordines, genera, species, cum characteribus, differentiis, synonymis, locis. Lipsiae : Georg. Emanuel. Beer Vermes. Vol. 1(Part 6) pp. 3021-3910. 
 Valenciennes, A. 1846. Mollusques. pls 1–24 in Dupetit-Thouars, A.H. (ed.). Voyage autour du monde sur le frigat la Venus commande par Abel Dupetit-Thouars. Atlas de Zoologie, Mollusques. Paris : Gide.
 Cotton, B.C. 1964. Molluscs of Arnhem Land. Records of the American-Australian Scientific Expedition to Arnhem Land 4 (Zoology): 9–43 
 Cernohorsky, W.O. 1978. Tropical Pacific marine shells. Sydney : Pacific Publications 352 pp., 68 pls
 Wilson, B. 1993. Australian Marine Shells. Prosobranch Gastropods. Kallaroo, Western Australia : Odyssey Publishing Vol. 1 408 pp.
 Williams, S.T. (2007). Origins and diversification of Indo-West Pacific marine fauna: evolutionary history and biogeography of turban shells (Gastropoda, Turbinidae). Biological Journal of the Linnean Society, 2007, 92, 573–592.

External links
 

stellare
Gastropods described in 1791
Taxa named by Johann Friedrich Gmelin